Mário Fernando Magalhães da Silva (born 24 April 1977) is a Portuguese former footballer who played as a left-back, currently a manager.

Playing career
Silva was born in Porto. Having grown through the ranks of local Boavista F.C. he went on to represent FC Nantes, FC Porto, Recreativo de Huelva and Cádiz CF, returning to Boavista in June 2006 and leaving after two seasons due to unpaid wages, in a litigation that would only be concluded in March 2010.

Silva enjoyed his best years while with Porto, playing second fiddle to Nuno Valente on a side that won the 2002–03 UEFA Cup and the following year's UEFA Champions League while also adding back-to-back Primeira Liga titles under José Mourinho. Also at the club, on 27 March 2002, he earned his sole cap for the Portugal national team, appearing in a 1–4 friendly home defeat against Finland.

Midway through the 2008–09 campaign, Silva moved countries again and joined Doxa Katokopias FC of the Cypriot First Division. However, he was released after only a couple of months, and retired in the summer after not being able to find a new team.

Coaching career
In 2010, Silva began working as a manager, acting as both youth and assistant coach in Boavista (the latter already in the main squad). In June of the following year, with the team still in the third division, he was appointed as Filipe Gouveia's successor.

Silva resigned from his position just five months into the season, citing lack of payment as the reason for his departure. He subsequently returned to Porto, going on to act as manager for several youth sides and leading the under-19s to the 2018–19 UEFA Youth League; he was however, replaced by Tulipa shortly after.

In September 2019, Silva was appointed director of academy at Spanish Segunda División club UD Almería, where his compatriot Pedro Emanuel was the coach. The following 26 June, he took the reins of the first team until the end of the campaign, but was dismissed on 27 July just before the start of the promotion play-offs.

Days after leaving Spain, Silva was given his first top-flight job in his country, replacing Carlos Carvalhal at Rio Ave FC. In the Europa League, the team were eliminated in the playoffs by A.C. Milan after conceding an equaliser in the last minute of extra time and losing 9–8 on penalties. He left on 30 December 2020, with them in 13th.

Silva became C.D. Santa Clara's fourth manager of the season on 10 January 2022, signing a short-term contract. He concluded the campaign in seventh place and signed a new deal until 2024, but was dismissed from his post near the anniversary of his appointment, with the team in 15th position after as many games.

Managerial statistics

Honours

Player
Boavista
Taça de Portugal: 1996–97
Supertaça Cândido de Oliveira: 1997

Nantes
Ligue 1: 2000–01

Porto
Primeira Liga: 2002–03, 2003–04
Taça de Portugal: 2002–03
Supertaça Cândido de Oliveira: 2001
UEFA Champions League: 2003–04
UEFA Cup: 2002–03

Portugal
UEFA European Under-18 Championship: 1994

Manager
Porto U19
Campeonato Nacional de Juniores: 2018–19
UEFA Youth League: 2018–19

References

External links

1977 births
Living people
Portuguese footballers
Footballers from Porto
Association football defenders
Primeira Liga players
Boavista F.C. players
FC Porto players
Ligue 1 players
FC Nantes players
La Liga players
Segunda División players
Recreativo de Huelva players
Cádiz CF players
Cypriot First Division players
Doxa Katokopias FC players
UEFA Champions League winning players
UEFA Cup winning players
Portugal youth international footballers
Portugal under-21 international footballers
Portugal B international footballers
Portugal international footballers
Portuguese expatriate footballers
Expatriate footballers in France
Expatriate footballers in Spain
Expatriate footballers in Cyprus
Portuguese expatriate sportspeople in France
Portuguese expatriate sportspeople in Spain
Portuguese expatriate sportspeople in Cyprus
Portuguese football managers
Primeira Liga managers
Boavista F.C. managers
Rio Ave F.C. managers
C.D. Santa Clara managers
Segunda División managers
UD Almería managers
Portuguese expatriate football managers
Expatriate football managers in Spain